Besiberri Sud is a mountain of the Massís del Besiberri, Catalonia, Spain. Located in the Pyrenees, it has an altitude of 3023.4 metres above sea level.

See also
Besiberri Nord
Besiberri del Mig
Geology of the Pyrenees

References

 Map Vall de Boí. Granollers: Editorial Alpina.
 Buyse, Juan. Los tresmiles del Pirineo. Barcelona: Editorial Martínez Roca.

External links
 Route from Túnel de Vielha

Mountains of Catalonia
Mountains of the Pyrenees
Pyrenean three-thousanders